Leslie Frederick Greengard (born 1957) is an American mathematician, physicist and computer scientist. He is co-inventor with Vladimir Rokhlin Jr. of the fast multipole method (FMM) in 1987, recognized as one of the top-ten algorithms of the 20th century.

Greengard was elected as a member of the National Academy of Engineering in 2006 for work on the development of algorithms and software for fast multipole methods.

Short biography
Leslie Frederick Greengard was born in 1957 in London, England, but grew up in the United States in New York City, Boston, and New Haven. He holds a B.A. in mathematics from Wesleyan University (1979), an M.D. from the Yale School of Medicine (1987), and a Ph.D. in computer science from Yale University (1987).

From 2006 to 2011, Greengard was director of the Courant Institute of Mathematical Sciences, an independent division of the New York University (NYU) and is currently a professor of mathematics and computer science at Courant. He is also a professor at New York University Tandon School of Engineering and the director of the Simons Center for Data Analysis.

He formerly served as the Director at the Center for Computational Biology at the Flatiron Institute. , he has assumed the directorship of the new Center of Computational Mathematics at the Institute.

He is the son of neuroscientist Paul Greengard and the nephew of Irene Kane, later known as Chris Chase, an actress, writer, and journalist.

Awards and honors
 2016, fellow of the American Academy of Arts and Sciences
 2014, Von Neumann Lecture, Society for Industrial and Applied Mathematics
 2011, Wilbur Cross Medal
 2010, Plenary Speaker, SIAM Annual Meeting
 2010, "National Security Science and Engineering Faculty Fellowship", from the U.S. Department of Defense (DoD)
 2006, elected to the U.S. National Academy of Engineering
 2006, elected to the U.S. National Academy of Sciences
 2005, Plenary Speaker, 2nd National Congress on Applied and Industrial Mathematics (France)
 2004, "Margaret and Herman Sokol Faculty Award in the Sciences" from the New York University
 2001, Leroy P. Steele Prize for Seminal Contribution to Research from the American Mathematical Society (together with Vladimir Rokhlin), for their paper describing a new algorithm: the fast multipole method (FMM)
 2000, Plenary Speaker, SIAM Conference on Computational Science & Engineering
 1999, Plenary Speaker, International Congress on Industrial and Applied Mathematics
 1998, Invited Speaker, International Congress of Mathematicians
 1990, "Fellowship for Science and Engineering" from the Packard Foundation
 1990, Presidential Young Investigator Award from the National Science Foundation
 1987–1989, "Mathematical Sciences Postdoctoral Research Fellowship" from the National Science Foundation
 1987, Council of Graduate Schools/University Microfilms International Distinguished Dissertation Award, for his PhD. dissertation "The Rapid Evaluation of Potential Fields in Particle Systems"
 1987, "Doctoral Dissertation Award", Series Winner from the Association for Computing Machinery
 1987, Sandoz Thesis Award from the Yale School of Medicine
 1979–1986, Public Health Service – National Research Service Award Medical Scientist Training Program

References

External links

20th-century American mathematicians
21st-century American mathematicians
Jewish American scientists
Members of the United States National Academy of Sciences
Members of the United States National Academy of Engineering
British emigrants to the United States
Living people
Wesleyan University alumni
Courant Institute of Mathematical Sciences faculty
Scientists from New York City
Year of birth missing (living people)
Polytechnic Institute of New York University faculty
Fellows of the American Academy of Arts and Sciences
Mathematicians from New York (state)
21st-century American Jews
1957 births